Relativity Urban Assault is a compilation album released by Relativity Records on September 10, 1996. The album's best known song is Common's "The Bitch in Yoo", which was a diss song aimed at rapper, Ice Cube and his group Westside Connection.

Track listing
"World Famous"- 4:01 (M.O.P.)  
"Find That" (The Beatnuts) 
"The Bitch in Yoo" (Common) 
"Firewater"- 4:14 (Fat Joe) 
"The Real Weight"- 3:36 (No I.D.) 
"Rugged-N-Raw"- 3:34 (PMD) 
"Games People Play"- 4:24 (Frankie Cutlass)  
"Out for the Cash"- 3:49 (DJ Honda, The Beatnuts & Fat Joe) 
"Blood Bath"- 4:25 (The Dayton Family) 
"Choppin' It Up"- 3:04 (Dru Down) 
"Opening Doors"- 4:40 (Mac Mall, Cold 187um & Kokane)
"Baby I Love You"- 6:12 (H-Town)  
"La Raza II"- 5:13 (Frost)

Hip hop compilation albums
1996 compilation albums
Relativity Records compilation albums